Ambler is an English surname. It may refer to:

 Alfred Ambler (born 1879), English footballer
 Charles Ambler (1868–1952), English footballer
 Charles Ambler (barrister) (1721–1794), English barrister and politician
 Charles Henry Ambler (1876–1957), American historian and writer
 David Ambler (born 1989), New Zealand sprinter
 Eric Ambler (1909–1998), British suspense novelist
 Fred Ambler (1894–1983), New Zealand businessman and politician
 Geoffrey Ambler (1904–1978), Royal Air Force officer
 George Ambler (born 1950), American politician
 Henry S. Ambler (1836–1905), American politician
 Jacob A. Ambler (1829–1906), American politician
 Joe Ambler (1860–1899), English cricketer
 John Ambler (1924–2008), British businessman married to Princess Margaretha of Sweden
 Joss Ambler (1900–1959), Australian-born British film and television actor
 Kevin Ambler (born 1961), American lawyer and politician
 Luke Ambler (born 1989), Irish rugby league player
 Princess Margaretha, Mrs. Ambler (born 1934), Swedish princess, sister of King Carl XVI Gustaf
 Ned Ambler, American filmmaker and photographer
 Pat Ambler, Scottish roboticist
 Richard Ambler (1933–2013), English molecular biologist
 Richard Charles Ambler (1853–1891), American politician
 Roy Ambler (1937–2007), English footballer
 Scott Ambler (born 1966), Canadian software engineer and author
 Stella Ambler (born 1966), Canadian politician
 Thomas Ambler (1838–1920), English architect
 Wayne Ambler (1915–1998), American Major League Baseball player

References 

English-language surnames
Surnames of English origin